Departamento Aeroportuário (DAP) is the department of aviation of the state of Rio Grande do Sul in Brazil. DAP is part of the Secretaria de Transportes do Governo do Estado do Rio Grande do Sul, and is responsible for the operation of 7 public airports within the state, in accordance to directives from the National Civil Aviation Agency of Brazil (ANAC).

It was created on January 30, 1950.

List of airports administered by DAP
The following airports are administered by DAP:
Carazinho 
Erechim – Erechim Airport
Ijuí – João Batista Bos Filho Airport
Rio Grande – Rio Grande Regional Airport 
Santa Rosa – Luís Alberto Lehr Airport
Torres – Torres Airport

List of airports once managed by DAP
The following airports were once managed by DAP:
Caxias do Sul – Hugo Cantergiani Airport (Campo dos Bugres Airport)
Passo Fundo – Lauro Kurtz Airport 
Santo Ângelo – Sepé Tiaraju Airport

See also
List of airports in Brazil

References

 
Airport operators